Quartz is a hard, crystalline mineral composed of silica (silicon dioxide). The atoms are linked in a continuous framework of SiO4 silicon–oxygen tetrahedra, with each oxygen being shared between two tetrahedra, giving an overall chemical formula of SiO2. Quartz is the second most abundant mineral in Earth's continental crust, behind feldspar.

Quartz exists in two forms, the normal α-quartz and the high-temperature β-quartz, both of which are chiral. Since the transformation is accompanied by a significant change in volume, it can easily induce microfracturing of ceramics or rocks passing through this temperature threshold.

There are many different varieties of quartz, several of which are classified as gemstones. Since antiquity, varieties of quartz have been the most commonly used minerals in the making of jewelry and hardstone carvings, especially in Eurasia.

Quartz is the mineral defining the value of 7 on the Mohs scale of hardness, a qualitative scratch method for determining the hardness of a material to abrasion.

Etymology 
The word "quartz" is derived from the German word "Quarz", which had the same form in the first half of the 14th century in Middle High German and in East Central German and which came from the Polish dialect term kwardy, which corresponds to the Czech term tvrdý ("hard").

The Ancient Greeks referred to quartz as κρύσταλλος (krustallos) derived from the Ancient Greek κρύος (kruos) meaning "icy cold", because some philosophers (including Theophrastus) apparently believed the mineral to be a form of supercooled ice. Today, the term rock crystal is sometimes used as an alternative name for transparent coarsely crystalline quartz.

Crystal habit and structure 
Quartz belongs to the trigonal crystal system at room temperature, and to the hexagonal crystal system above . The ideal crystal shape is a six-sided prism terminating with six-sided pyramids at each end. In nature quartz crystals are often twinned (with twin right-handed and left-handed quartz crystals), distorted, or so intergrown with adjacent crystals of quartz or other minerals as to only show part of this shape, or to lack obvious crystal faces altogether and appear massive. Well-formed crystals typically form as a druse (a layer of crystals lining a void), of which quartz geodes are particularly fine examples. The crystals are attached at one end to the enclosing rock, and only one termination pyramid is present. However, doubly terminated crystals do occur where they develop freely without attachment, for instance, within gypsum.

α-quartz crystallizes in the trigonal crystal system, space group P3121 or P3221 (space group 152 or 154 resp.) depending on the chirality. Above , α-quartz in P3121 becomes the more symmetric hexagonal P6422 (space group 181), and α-quartz in P3221 goes to space group P6222 (no. 180). These space groups are truly chiral (they each belong to the 11 enantiomorphous pairs). Both α-quartz and β-quartz are examples of chiral crystal structures composed of achiral building blocks (SiO4 tetrahedra in the present case). The transformation between α- and β-quartz only involves a comparatively minor rotation of the tetrahedra with respect to one another, without a change in the way they are linked. However, there is a significant change in volume during this transition, and this can result in significant microfracturing in ceramics and in rocks of the Earth's crust.

Varieties (according to microstructure) 
Although many of the varietal names historically arose from the color of the mineral, current scientific naming schemes refer primarily to the microstructure of the mineral. Color is a secondary identifier for the cryptocrystalline minerals, although it is a primary identifier for the macrocrystalline varieties.

Varieties (according to color) 

Pure quartz, traditionally called rock crystal or clear quartz, is colorless and transparent or translucent, and has often been used for hardstone carvings, such as the Lothair Crystal. Common colored varieties include citrine, rose quartz, amethyst, smoky quartz, milky quartz, and others. These color differentiations arise from the presence of impurities which change the molecular orbitals, causing some electronic transitions to take place in the visible spectrum causing colors.

The most important distinction between types of quartz is that of macrocrystalline (individual crystals visible to the unaided eye) and the microcrystalline or cryptocrystalline varieties (aggregates of crystals visible only under high magnification). The cryptocrystalline varieties are either translucent or mostly opaque, while the transparent varieties tend to be macrocrystalline. Chalcedony is a cryptocrystalline form of silica consisting of fine intergrowths of both quartz, and its monoclinic polymorph moganite. Other opaque gemstone varieties of quartz, or mixed rocks including quartz, often including contrasting bands or patterns of color, are agate, carnelian or sard, onyx, heliotrope, and jasper.

Amethyst

Amethyst is a form of quartz that ranges from a bright vivid violet to a dark or dull lavender shade. The world's largest deposits of amethysts can be found in Brazil, Mexico, Uruguay, Russia, France, Namibia, and Morocco. Sometimes amethyst and citrine are found growing in the same crystal. It is then referred to as ametrine. Amethyst derives its color from traces of iron in its structure.

Blue quartz 
Blue quartz contains inclusions of fibrous magnesio-riebeckite or crocidolite.

Dumortierite quartz 
Inclusions of the mineral dumortierite within quartz pieces often result in silky-appearing splotches with a blue hue. Shades of purple or grey sometimes also are present. "Dumortierite quartz" (sometimes called "blue quartz") will sometimes feature contrasting light and dark color zones across the material. "Blue quartz" is a minor gemstone.

Citrine 
Citrine is a variety of quartz whose color ranges from pale yellow to brown due to a submicroscopic distribution of colloidal ferric hydroxide impurities. Natural citrines are rare; most commercial citrines are heat-treated amethysts or smoky quartzes. However, a heat-treated amethyst will have small lines in the crystal, as opposed to a natural citrine's cloudy or smoky appearance. It is nearly impossible to differentiate between cut citrine and yellow topaz visually, but they differ in hardness. Brazil is the leading producer of citrine, with much of its production coming from the state of Rio Grande do Sul. The name is derived from the Latin word citrina which means "yellow" and is also the origin of the word "citron". Sometimes citrine and amethyst can be found together in the same crystal, which is then referred to as ametrine. Citrine has been referred to as the "merchant's stone" or "money stone", due to a superstition that it would bring prosperity.

Citrine was first appreciated as a golden-yellow gemstone in Greece between 300 and 150 BC, during the Hellenistic Age. Yellow quartz was used prior to that to decorate jewelry and tools but it was not highly sought after.

Milky quartz 
Milk quartz or milky quartz is the most common variety of crystalline quartz. The white color is caused by minute fluid inclusions of gas, liquid, or both, trapped during crystal formation, making it of little value for optical and quality gemstone applications.

Rose quartz 
 
Rose quartz is a type of quartz that exhibits a pale pink to rose red hue. The color is usually considered as due to trace amounts of titanium, iron, or manganese, in the material. Some rose quartz contains microscopic rutile needles that produce asterism in transmitted light. Recent X-ray diffraction studies suggest that the color is due to thin microscopic fibers of possibly dumortierite within the quartz.

Additionally, there is a rare type of pink quartz (also frequently called crystalline rose quartz) with color that is thought to be caused by trace amounts of phosphate or aluminium. The color in crystals is apparently photosensitive and subject to fading. The first crystals were found in a pegmatite found near Rumford, Maine, US and in Minas Gerais, Brazil. The crystals found are more transparent and euhedral, due to the impurities of phosphate and aluminium that formed crystalline rose quartz, unlike the iron and microscopic dumortierite fibers that formed rose quartz.

Smoky quartz 
Smoky quartz is a gray, translucent version of quartz. It ranges in clarity from almost complete transparency to a brownish-gray crystal that is almost opaque. Some can also be black. The translucency results from natural irradiation acting on minute traces of aluminum in the crystal structure.

Prasiolite 

Prasiolite, also known as vermarine, is a variety of quartz that is green in color. Since 1950, almost all natural prasiolite has come from a small Brazilian mine, but it is also seen in Lower Silesia in Poland. Naturally occurring prasiolite is also found in the Thunder Bay area of Canada. It is a rare mineral in nature; most green quartz is heat-treated amethyst.

Synthetic and artificial treatments 

Not all varieties of quartz are naturally occurring. Some clear quartz crystals can be treated using heat or gamma-irradiation to induce color where it would not otherwise have occurred naturally. Susceptibility to such treatments depends on the location from which the quartz was mined.

Prasiolite, an olive colored material, is produced by heat treatment; natural prasiolite has also been observed in Lower Silesia in Poland. Although citrine occurs naturally, the majority is the result of heat-treating amethyst or smoky quartz. Carnelian has been heat-treated to deepen its color since prehistoric times.

Because natural quartz is often twinned, synthetic quartz is produced for use in industry. Large, flawless, single crystals are synthesized in an autoclave via the hydrothermal process.

Like other crystals, quartz may be coated with metal vapors to give it an attractive sheen.

Occurrence 

Quartz is a defining constituent of granite and other felsic igneous rocks. It is very common in sedimentary rocks such as sandstone and shale. It is a common constituent of schist, gneiss, quartzite and other metamorphic rocks. Quartz has the lowest potential for weathering in the Goldich dissolution series and consequently it is very common as a residual mineral in stream sediments and residual soils. Generally a high presence of quartz suggests a "mature" rock, since it indicates the rock has been heavily reworked and quartz was the primary mineral that endured heavy weathering.

While the majority of quartz crystallizes from molten magma, quartz also chemically precipitates from hot hydrothermal veins as gangue, sometimes with ore minerals like gold, silver and copper. Large crystals of quartz are found in magmatic pegmatites. Well-formed crystals may reach several meters in length and weigh hundreds of kilograms.

Elemental impurity incorporation strongly influences the ability to process and utilize quartz. Naturally occurring quartz crystals of extremely high purity, necessary for the crucibles and other equipment used for growing silicon wafers in the semiconductor industry, are expensive and rare. These high-purity quartz are defined containing less than 50 ppm of impurity elements. A major mining location for high purity quartz is the Spruce Pine Gem Mine in Spruce Pine, North Carolina, United States. Quartz may also be found in Caldoveiro Peak, in Asturias, Spain.

Mining 
Quartz is extracted from open pit mines. Miners occasionally use explosives to expose deep pockets of quartz. More frequently, bulldozers and backhoes are used to remove soil and clay and expose quartz veins, which are then worked using hand tools. Care must be taken to avoid sudden temperature changes that may damage the crystals.

Almost all the industrial demand for quartz crystal (used primarily in electronics) is met with synthetic quartz produced by the hydrothermal process. However, synthetic crystals are less prized for use as gemstones. The popularity of crystal healing has increased the demand for natural quartz crystals, which are now often mined in developing countries using primitive mining methods, sometimes involving child labor.

Related silica minerals 

Tridymite and cristobalite are high-temperature polymorphs of SiO2 that occur in high-silica volcanic rocks. Coesite is a denser polymorph of SiO2 found in some meteorite impact sites and in metamorphic rocks formed at pressures greater than those typical of the Earth's crust. Stishovite is a yet denser and higher-pressure polymorph of SiO2 found in some meteorite impact sites. Lechatelierite is an amorphous silica glass SiO2 which is formed by lightning strikes in quartz sand.

Safety 
As quartz is a form of silica, it is a possible cause for concern in various workplaces. Cutting, grinding, chipping, sanding, drilling, and polishing natural and manufactured stone products can release hazardous levels of very small, crystalline silica dust particles into the air that workers breathe. Crystalline silica of respirable size is a recognized human carcinogen and may lead to other diseases of the lungs such as silicosis and pulmonary fibrosis.

History 
The word "quartz" comes from the German , which is of Slavic origin (Czech miners called it křemen). Other sources attribute the word's origin to the Saxon word Querkluftertz, meaning cross-vein ore.

Quartz is the most common material identified as the mystical substance maban in Australian Aboriginal mythology. It is found regularly in passage tomb cemeteries in Europe in a burial context, such as Newgrange or Carrowmore in Ireland. The Irish word for quartz is grianchloch, which means 'sunstone'. Quartz was also used in Prehistoric Ireland, as well as many other countries, for stone tools; both vein quartz and rock crystal were knapped as part of the lithic technology of the prehistoric peoples.

While jade has been since earliest times the most prized semi-precious stone for carving in East Asia and Pre-Columbian America, in Europe and the Middle East the different varieties of quartz were the most commonly used for the various types of jewelry and hardstone carving, including engraved gems and cameo gems, rock crystal vases, and extravagant vessels. The tradition continued to produce objects that were very highly valued until the mid-19th century, when it largely fell from fashion except in jewelry. Cameo technique exploits the bands of color in onyx and other varieties.

Roman naturalist Pliny the Elder believed quartz to be water ice, permanently frozen after great lengths of time. (The word "crystal" comes from the Greek word κρύσταλλος, "ice".) He supported this idea by saying that quartz is found near glaciers in the Alps, but not on volcanic mountains, and that large quartz crystals were fashioned into spheres to cool the hands. This idea persisted until at least the 17th century. He also knew of the ability of quartz to split light into a spectrum.

In the 17th century, Nicolas Steno's study of quartz paved the way for modern crystallography. He discovered that regardless of a quartz crystal's size or shape, its long prism faces always joined at a perfect 60° angle.

Quartz's piezoelectric properties were discovered by Jacques and Pierre Curie in 1880. The quartz oscillator or resonator was first developed by Walter Guyton Cady in 1921. George Washington Pierce designed and patented quartz crystal oscillators in 1923. Warren Marrison created the first quartz oscillator clock based on the work of Cady and Pierce in 1927.

Efforts to synthesize quartz began in the mid-nineteenth century as scientists attempted to create minerals under laboratory conditions that mimicked the conditions in which the minerals formed in nature: German geologist Karl Emil von Schafhäutl (1803–1890) was the first person to synthesize quartz when in 1845 he created microscopic quartz crystals in a pressure cooker. However, the quality and size of the crystals that were produced by these early efforts were poor.

By the 1930s, the electronics industry had become dependent on quartz crystals. The only source of suitable crystals was Brazil; however, World War II disrupted the supplies from Brazil, so nations attempted to synthesize quartz on a commercial scale. German mineralogist Richard Nacken (1884–1971) achieved some success during the 1930s and 1940s. After the war, many laboratories attempted to grow large quartz crystals. In the United States, the U.S. Army Signal Corps contracted with Bell Laboratories and with the Brush Development Company of Cleveland, Ohio to synthesize crystals following Nacken's lead. (Prior to World War II, Brush Development produced piezoelectric crystals for record players.) By 1948, Brush Development had grown crystals that were 1.5 inches (3.8 cm) in diameter, the largest to date. By the 1950s, hydrothermal synthesis techniques were producing synthetic quartz crystals on an industrial scale, and today virtually all the quartz crystal used in the modern electronics industry is synthetic.

Piezoelectricity 
Quartz crystals have piezoelectric properties; they develop an electric potential upon the application of mechanical stress. An early use of this property of quartz crystals was in phonograph pickups. One of the most common piezoelectric uses of quartz today is as a crystal oscillator. The quartz clock is a familiar device using the mineral. The resonant frequency of a quartz crystal oscillator is changed by mechanically loading it, and this principle is used for very accurate measurements of very small mass changes in the quartz crystal microbalance and in thin-film thickness monitors.

See also 

 Fused quartz
 List of minerals
 Quartz fiber
 Quartz reef mining
 Quartzolite
 Shocked quartz
 Quartz rose

References

External links 

 Quartz varieties, properties, crystal morphology. Photos and illustrations
 Gilbert Hart, "Nomenclature of Silica", American Mineralogist, Volume 12, pp. 383–395. 1927
 
 Terminology used to describe the characteristics of quartz crystals when used as oscillators
 Quartz use as prehistoric stone tool raw material

 
Dielectrics
Piezoelectric materials
Symbols of Georgia (U.S. state)
Trigonal minerals
Minerals in space group 152 or 154
Minerals in space group 180 or 181
Luminescent minerals
Quartz gemstones
Industrial minerals
Silica polymorphs
Symbols of South Dakota